Brisbane Ladies is an Australian folksong and is one of many adaptations of Spanish Ladies. The version given below is the most commonly sung, but the original mentions Nanango favorably as "that jolly old township". The song is also known as "Augathella Station".

History
The lyric dates back to at least the 1880s and is credited to a jackaroo turned shopkeeper, named Saul Mendelsohn, who lived near Nanango.  The place names used in the song were part of the route that cattle drovers used when returning from Brisbane to the cattle station at Augathella, which is located in west-central Queensland.  Those place names include Toowong, Queensland, Augathella, Caboolture, Kilcoy, Collington's Hut, Blackbutt, Bob Williamson's paddock, Taromeo, Yarraman Creek, Nanango and Toomancie.

Australian Folklore Occasional Paper

A 53-page Australian folklore occasional paper entitled "Brisbane Ladies" was written by Ron Edwards about the history of this folk song and was based upon the research done by Bob Michell.

Lyrics

Farewell and adieu to you, Brisbane ladies 
Farewell and adieu, you maids of Toowong
We've sold all our cattle and we have to get a movin'
But we hope we shall see you again before long.

Chorus:
We'll rant and we'll roar like true Queensland drovers
We'll rant and we'll roar as onward we push
Until we return to the Augathella station
Oh, it's flamin' dry goin' through the old Queensland bush.

The first camp we make, we shall call it the Quart Pot,
Caboolture, then Kilcoy, and Colinton's Hut,
We'll pull up at the Stone House, Bob Williamson's paddock,
And early next morning we cross the Blackbutt.

Chorus

Then on to Taromeo and Yarraman Creek, lads,
It's there we shall make our next camp for the day
Where the water and grass are both plenty and sweet, lads,
And maybe we'll butcher a fat little stray.

Chorus

Then on to Nanango, that hard-bitten township
Where the out-of-work station-hands sit in the dust,
Where the shearers get shorn by old Tim, the contractor
Oh, I wouldn't go near there, but I flaming well must!

Chorus

The girls of Toomancie they look so entrancing
Like bawling young heifers they're out for their fun
With the waltz and the polka and all kinds of dancing
To the rackety old banjo of Bob Anderson.

Chorus

Then fill up your glasses, and drink to the lasses,
We'll drink this town dry, then farewell to them all
And when we've got back to the Augathella Station,
We hope you'll come by there and pay us a call.

Artists that have performed "Brisbane Ladies"
"Brisbane Ladies" has been performed and recorded by a number of various Australian artists, including bush bands.
 Snake Gully Bush Band
 The Wild Colonial Boys
 John Greenway on the 1959 album "Australian Folksongs and Ballads"
 Gary Shearston on the 1964 album "Folk Songs And Ballads Of Australia"
 Various Artists at the 2004 "Chris Kempster Tribute Concert"
 The Bushwackers, under the title of "Augathella Station" on the album "Murrumbidgee"
 Hoyt Axton recorded Brisbane Ladies on his album "Greenback Dollar, Live at the Trubadour"

References

External links
 http://folkstream.com/013.html
 http://www.ibiblio.org/jimmy/folkden-wp/?p=6962
 http://mainlynorfolk.info/lloyd/songs/brisbaneladies.html

Australian folk songs
History of Brisbane